was a 3D MMORPG developed by a Finnish indie software company, Coolhouse in 2003.  It incorporates anime-style characters into a medieval fantasy world.

Gekkeiju Online was a GameOgre.com online game of the week, highlighting the MUD-style gameplay which is considered more in-depth than regular MMORPGs.

A completely redone version of Gekkeiju Online launched to public beta test in January 2010.

The project is no longer operational, with its website displaying an error page from May 16th, 2020, changing to a simple message stating "Project may be rebooted at later date" from August 13th, 2020 onwards.

Races 

The game's character options consist of nine playable character races, each with their own advantages and disadvantages. The playable races are: humans, elves, halflings, half-giants, dwarves, wild elves, dark elves, goblins and catfolk.

It's possible to change the race during playing through reincarnation offered by various NPCs in game. This is also the only way to get access to some of the races.

Character Class system 

There are 5 character classes available in Gekkeiju Online - warrior, commoner, magic user, divine arts and dark arts. Each of the character classes has its own set of guilds that can be joined to learn skills and spells. The character class also decides the skills and spells character learns automatically during the first 10 levels.

Warrior is the very basic fighter class. Their guilds specialize in melee, ranged attacks and animal taming. New players always start as warriors.

Commoners are a combinations of spell casters and fighters. Their guilds include for example bards and merchants.

Magic Users are the strongest users of magic. They can learn spells from defensive to offensive.

Divine Arts are a spellcaster class that uses divine spiritual magic such as healing-spells. Divine arts can also learn some combat skills.

Dark Arts are the evil counterpart of divine arts. Dark Arts spells are focused on damage used to supplement melee combat skill. Their guilds include death knights and fallen priests.

Advancement 
Advancement of character in Gekkeiju Online happens by gaining experience points by either solving quests or by killing monsters. The advancement, however, doesn't happen automatically but player needs to purchase character levels with the gained experience points which can be done at level trainer NPCs.

Character will automatically learn skills during the first 10 levels every time after level advancement. However, starting at level 10 the only way to learn skills and spells is to join a guild. It's then possible to train skills in the guild with experience points. This means that starting at level 10 player needs to choose between level and skill advancement.

PvP System 
Player versus player (PvP) killing in Gekkeiju Online is nearly free and without other than game enforced limitations. The limitations help those who do not like player killing. The maps in the game are divided into different PvP types:-- Guarded and PvP. 

Guarded maps allow players to fight each other but attacking will flag the attacking player as criminal. Guarded areas also always have guard NPCs that hunt down all criminal players. Criminal players will drop their whole inventory on ground and be teleported into jail when killed. The jail time depends on the number of players killed in a guarded map.

In PvP maps fighting is allowed but slightly limited. If the attacked player doesn't retaliate before being killed by a player, the attacker will be flagged as murderer. The only way to remove the murderer flag is to gain experience points by killing monsters. Murderers also have a small chance of dropping some of their items when killed.

Awards 
 GameOgre's Game of the Week
 Winner of Irrlicht's March 2009 Screenshot of the Month-competition
 Winner of Irrlicht's Screenshot of the Year 2009-competition

See also 

List of MMORPGs

References

External links 
 Gekkeiju Online Official homepage

Fantasy video games
Massively multiplayer online role-playing games
Video games developed in Finland
Windows games
Windows-only games
2003 video games